Cricket Finland is the official governing body of the sport of cricket in Finland. Its current headquarters and National Cricket Ground are located in Kerava, Finland. Cricket Finland is Finland's representative at the International Cricket Council (ICC) and is an associate member and has been a member of that body since 2000. It belongs to the ICC Europe region.

In July 2020, Cricket Finland won the Digital Engagement of the Year award, in the ICC's Annual Development Awards to recognise developing cricketing nations.

References

External links

Cricket administration
Association
Cricket